Nirmal Udhas is a ghazal singer and the second brother of the Udhas brothers, the others being Manhar Udhas and Pankaj Udhas. They came from a humble background in Gujarat, India. Nirmal was born to Keshubhai Udhas and Jitubhen Udhas in Jetpur on 5 November 1944.

References

1944 births
Living people
Indian male ghazal singers
People from Rajkot district